Bala Eshtuj (also Romanized as Bālā Eshtūj; also known as Bālā Eshtūkh, Eshtūj, and Oshtūj) is a village in Do Hezar Rural District, Khorramabad District, Tonekabon County, Mazandaran Province, Iran. At the 2006 census, its population was 119, in 36 families.

References 

Populated places in Tonekabon County